The PSA Super Series 2010 is a series of men's squash tournaments which are part of the Professional Squash Association (PSA) World Tour for the 2010 squash season. The PSA Super Series tournaments are some of the most prestigious events on the men's tour. The best-performing players in the Super Series events qualify for the annual 2010 PSA World Series Finals tournament. Nick Matthew and Amr Shabana managed to reach the final of the 2010 PSA World Series Squash Finals, but this year there was no winner, because the venue at the Queens Club arena where the final was due to take place was damaged by gales.

PSA Super Series Ranking Points
PSA Super Series events also have a separate World Series ranking.  Points for this are calculated on a cumulative basis after each Super Series event. The top eight players at the end of the calendar year are then eligible to play in the PSA World Series Finals.

2010 Tournaments

Super Series Standings 2010

Bold – The first eight players present for the final

See also
PSA World Tour 2010
PSA World Series
Official Men's Squash World Ranking

References

External links 
 World Series Series Squash website
 PSA World Tour Calendar

PSA World Tour seasons
2010 in squash